The Faculty of Chemistry (since 2014 The Institute of Chemistry)   at Saint Petersburg State University is one of the leading chemistry faculties in Russia.

History
Formally, the Department of Chemistry has been created as a separate entity of Saint Petersburg State University (then Leningrad State University) in 1929. However, the history of chemistry at Saint Petersburg State University began much earlier. First chemistry laboratory and lectures in chemistry were introduced at the University in 1833. One of the first professors of chemistry was Alexander Voskresensky, a doctoral student of Justus von Liebig. Voskresensky largely contributed to the growth of chemistry classes at the University. He initiated lectures in organic chemistry (1843) and promoted first scientific projects. Later, in 1868, the chemistry division hosted then by the Department of Physics and Mathematics was split into three to form the division of organic chemistry led by Aleksandr Butlerov, the division of inorganic chemistry led by Dmitri Mendeleev and the division of analytical chemistry led by Nikolai Menshutkin. Since then, the University of Saint-Petersburg became home to one of the most elite chemistry schools in the country. Many prominent Russian chemists began their career and/or worked there. Among them are Nikolay Zinin, Alexey Favorsky, Lev Aleksandrovich Chugaev, Dmitry Konovalov, Sergei Vasiljevich Lebedev, Vyacheslav Tishchenko, Vladimir Ipatieff, Nikolay Semyonov, Boris Nikolsky, Mikhail Shultz.

In the Soviet era, the Department of Chemistry continued to grow with new divisions: colloid chemistry (1939), electrochemistry (1940), chemistry of macromolecular compounds (1944), radiochemistry (1945), physical organic chemistry (1946), theory of solutions (1950), chemistry of natural compounds (1963), quantum chemistry (1967), solid state chemistry (1978).

Campuses
Historically, some of the first chemistry offices were located in the main building of Saint Petersburg State University called Twelve Collegia. The remainder of these is the Mendeleev museum located on the first floor of the central part of this enormous building. In the 20th century, the Department of Chemistry was headquartered at 41/43 Sredniy prospekt on Vasilievsky Island, about one mile west of Twelve Collegia. In the 1980s, most of the laboratories were relocated to a more spacious building in the newly constructed campus in the suburb of Peterhof.

Divisions
Currently, there are 14 scientific divisions in the chemistry department:
 Analytical chemistry
 Chemistry of macromolecular compounds
 Chemistry of natural compounds
 Colloid chemistry
 Electrochemistry
 General and Inorganic chemistry
 Laser Chemistry and Laser Material Science
 Organic chemistry
 Physical chemistry
 Physical organic chemistry
 Radiochemistry
 Quantum chemistry
 Solid state chemistry
 Chemical Thermodynamics and Kinetics
 Laboratory of Biomedical Chemistry
 Laboratory of Chemical Pharmacology

References

External links
 Mendeleev museum website
 Info about Mendeleev museum on the St. Petersburg State University website
 Chemistry at Saint-Petersburg State University: Historical perspective - 

Universities in Saint Petersburg
Chemistry
Chemistry education